Castonguay is a surname. Notable people with this surname include:

Alexandre Castonguay (born 1968), Canadian media artist
Antoine Castonguay (1881–1959), Canadian politician
Charles Castonguay (born 1940), Canadian mathematician
Claude Castonguay (1929–2020), Canadian politician
Émilie Castonguay, Canadian sports agent
Éric Castonguay (born 1987), Canadian ice hockey player
Jeannot Castonguay (born 1944), Canadian politician
Marilyn Castonguay, Canadian actress
Mike Castonguay, American musician
Roch Castonguay, Canadian film and television actor

See also